Scythris cirra is a moth of the family Scythrididae. It was described by Mark I. Falkovitsh in 1969. It is found in Kazakhstan, Kyrgyzstan, Mongolia, Turkmenistan and Uzbekistan.

References

cirra
Moths described in 1969
Moths of Asia